is 22-story office and TV studio building located in Akasaka, Minato, Tokyo, Japan. It is a part of akasaka Sacas, and houses the headquarters of Tokyo Broadcasting System. CBS News Tokyo bureau is located in TBS broadcasting center. 

The building was built by Obayashi Corporation,Kajima and Taisei Corporation. Construction was started in 1991 and finished in 1994. The nickname of TBS Broadcasting Center is “big hat”, was named after the circle heliport which on the top of building.

References

Buildings and structures in Minato, Tokyo
Tokyo Broadcasting System
Office buildings completed in 1994